Prasanna Shamal Senarath is the Opposition Leader North Western Province, Sri Lanka and the United National Party (UNP) Kurunegala District Leader.

References

Sinhalese politicians
Sri Lankan Buddhists
Alumni of Nalanda College, Colombo
Provincial councillors of Sri Lanka
Living people
Year of birth missing (living people)